Kennedy Channel is an Arctic sea passage between Greenland and Canada's most northerly island, Ellesmere Island.

It was named by Elisha Kane around 1854 during his second Arctic voyage in search of the lost Franklin expedition. It is not entirely clear, however, for which Kennedy he named the channel. Kane may have had his fellow explorer William Kennedy in mind, whom he had met a few years previously while both were involved in earlier searches for Franklin's expedition. However, most historians believe it was named for John Pendleton Kennedy, the United States Secretary of the Navy during 1852 to 1853, under whose direction Kane's second Arctic voyage took place.

Geography
It forms part of Nares Strait, linking Kane Basin with Hall Basin. From the south, its beginning is marked by Capes Lawrence and Jackson; its junction with Hall Basin is marked by Capes Baird and Morton. It is about 130 kilometres in length, between 24 and 32 kilometres in width and averages water depths between 180 and 340 metres.

It contains Hans Island, with an ownership shared between Canada and Denmark, because it is located close to the middle between the two coastlines, but about 1000 meters closer to Greenland's coast. The channel also contains two more islands, Franklin Island and Crozier Island which are located much closer to the Greenland coast and therefore belong to Greenland. Hannah Island is located at the mouth of the Bessel Fjord, northeast of Cape Bryan.

References 

 National Geospatial-Intelligence Agency, Sailing Directions Enroute: Pub 181 Greenland and Iceland (Enroute), 2002.

Further reading

 Dewing, Keith, J Harrison, Brian Pratt, and Ulrich Mayr. 2004. "A Probable Late Neoproterozoic Age for the Kennedy Channel and Ella Bay Formations, Northeastern Ellesmere Island and Its Implications for Passive Margin History of the Canadian Arctic". Canadian Journal of Earth Sciences. 41: 1013–1025.
 Kerr, J. William. Kennedy Channel and Lady Franklin Bay, District of Franklin. 1973. 
 Long, Darrel Graham Francis. Kennedy Channel Formation Key to the Early History of the Franklinian Continental Margin, Central Eastern Ellesmere Island, Arctic Canada : Supplementary Unpublished Data. Canadian journal of earth sciences, v. 26, pp. 1147–1159, suppl. mat. 1989. 

Straits of Greenland
Channels of Qikiqtaaluk Region
International straits
Canada–Greenland border